Kizilyurt (Qızıl-yurt) is a town in the Republic of Dagestan, Russia, about  northwest of Makhachkala. Population: . It is located where the north-flowing Sulak River leaves the mountains and enters the Terek-Sulak Lowland.

Etymology 
The name  is of Kumyk origin.

History 
It was founded in 1963 by merging the work settlements of Kizilyurt, Bavtugay, and Sulak.

Administrative and municipal status
Within the framework of administrative divisions, Kizilyurt serves as the administrative center of Kizilyurtovsky District, even though it is not a part of it. As an administrative division, it is, together with two settlements of urban type (Bavtugay and Novy Sulak) and one rural locality (the selo of Stary Bavtugay), incorporated separately as the Town of Kizilyurt—an administrative unit with the status equal to that of the districts. As a municipal division, the Town of Kizilyurt is incorporated as Kizilyurt Urban Okrug.

Demographics
Ethnic groups in the city administrative area (2002 census):
Avars (70.3%)
Kumyks (12.7%)
Laks (5.4%)
Russians (4.2%)
Dargins (2.3%)
Lezgins (2.3%)
Chechens (1.0%)

Ethnic groups in the city itself (2002 census):
Avars (69.0%)
Kumyks (12.3%)
Laks (5.9%)
Russians (4.4%)
Lezgins (2.8%)
Dargins (2.3%)
Chechens (1.0%)

Climate
Kizilyurt has a humid continental climate (Köppen climate classification: Dfa).

References

Notes

Sources

External links

Cities and towns in Dagestan